Emmanuel or Emanuel Rondthaler (July 27, 1764 — June 6, 1847) was a distinguished German Moravian minister, educator, and poet, widely recognized as the author of the first published poem in the Pennsylvania German language. Rondthaler's poem, first published as "Abendlied," in Philip Schaff's Deutscher Kirchenfreund in August 1849, is known better as "Morgets und Owets" or "Maryets un Owets (Owetlied)." Rondthaler was a tutor at Nazareth Hall in Nazareth, Pennsylvania from 1832 to 1839. The Abendlied has been published in at least four versions of Pennsylvania German orthography, and in several English translations.

Rondthaler is buried in Nazareth Moravian Cemetery. Earl C. Haag incorrectly identifies his birth year as 1815, but his 1847 burial record indicates that he was "aged 82 years, 10 months, 10 days."

References
John Frederick Berg, Faith and Peace: A Sermon, Occasioned by the Death of the Rev. Emanuel Rondthaler, Pastor of the Church of the United Brethren, in Philadelphia. Addressed to the Congregations of the Moravian and First German Reformed Churches, December 10, 1848
Levin Theodore Reichel, A History of Nazareth Hall, from 1755 to 1855: And of the Reunions of Its Former Pupils, in 1854 and 1855 (1855)
William Cornelius Reichel, Historical Sketch of Nazareth Hall from 1755 to 1869: With an Account of the Reunions of Former Pupils and of the Inauguration of a Monument at Nazareth on the 11th of June, 1868, Erected in Memory of Alumni Who Fell in the Late Rebellion (Philadelphia: J. B. Lippincott, 1869)
The Pennsylvania-German, Vol. I, No. 2 (Lebanon, Pennsylvania) (April, 1900)
Transactions of the Moravian Historical Society, Volume 7 (1910) [Poem titled "Morgelied"]
Hogan Hacker, Nazareth Hall: An Historical Sketch and Roster of Principals, Teachers and Pupils (1910)
Harry Hess Reichard, Pennsylvania-German Dialect Writings and Their Writers: A Paper Prepared at the Request of the Pennsylvania-German Society (1918)
Earl C. Haag, A Pennsylvania German Anthology (1988)

External links
Text of the poem from Richard Mammana

1764 births
1847 deaths
German people of the Moravian Church
Writers of the Moravian Church